Fourpole Creek is a  tributary of the Tug Fork, belonging to the Ohio River and Mississippi River watersheds. It is located in McDowell and Mingo counties in the U.S. state of West Virginia.  Fourpole Creek forms the boundary between McDowell and Mingo counties.

Tributaries
Tributary streams are listed from source to mouth.

Sims Fork
Brushy Fork

List of cities and towns along Fourpole Creek
Isaban
Mohawk

See also
 List of West Virginia rivers

References

Rivers of West Virginia
Rivers of McDowell County, West Virginia
Rivers of Mingo County, West Virginia